Valber Roberto Huerta Jerez (born 26 August 1993) is a Chilean professional footballer who plays for Liga MX club Toluca.

Club career
Born in Melipilla, Huerta graduated from Universidad de Chile's youth setup, and was promoted to the main squad in 2012 by manager Jorge Sampaoli. He made his professional debut on 6 May 2012, starting in a 0–2 away loss against Universidad de Concepción for the Torneo Apertura championship.

Huerta only acted as a fourth-choice during his spell at La U, behind Roberto Cereceda, Albert Acevedo and José Rojas. On 28 August 2014 he moved abroad for the first time in his career, signing a five-year deal with Granada CF and being assigned to the reserves in Segunda División B.

In July 2017 he joined English Premier League side Watford and was immediately loaned out to Huachipato.

In February 2022 he joined Mexican Liga MX side Deportivo Toluca  from Universidad Catolica being a starter & leader of the defense was also called up to the Chile National Team he was later presented with jersey #4 for the 2022 campaign.

International career
He represented Chile U20 at the 2013 South American Youth Football Championship and 2013 FIFA U-20 World Cup, where Chile reached the quarter-finals.

At senior level, he has been a substitute in the friendly matches against Sweden and Denmark on 2018 and against Bolivia on 2021. Also, he was called up to some training microcycles by Reinaldo Rueda.

Career statistics

Club

International

Honours

Club
Universidad de Chile
 Primera División: 2012–A
 Copa Chile: 2012–13

Colo-Colo
 Copa Chile: 2016

Universidad Católica
 Primera División: 2019, 2020, 2021
 Supercopa de Chile: 2019, 2020, 2021

References

External links
 Granada official profile 
 

1993 births
Living people
People from Melipilla Province
Chilean footballers
Chilean expatriate footballers
Chile international footballers
Chile under-20 international footballers
Association football defenders
Chilean Primera División players
Universidad de Chile footballers
C.D. Huachipato footballers
Colo-Colo footballers
Club Deportivo Universidad Católica footballers
Segunda División B players
Club Recreativo Granada players
Premier League players
Watford F.C. players
Liga MX players
Deportivo Toluca F.C. players
Chilean expatriate sportspeople in Spain
Chilean expatriate sportspeople in England
Chilean expatriate sportspeople in Mexico
Expatriate footballers in Spain
Expatriate footballers in England
Expatriate footballers in Mexico